Rice High School is a public high school located in the city of Rice, Texas, USA and classified as a 3A school by the UIL.  It is a part of the Rice Independent School District located in north central Navarro County.   In 2015, the school was rated "Met Standard" by the Texas Education Agency.

Athletics
The Rice Bulldogs compete in these sports - 

Volleyball, Cross Country, Football, Basketball, Powerlifting, Golf, Tennis, Track, Baseball & Softball

Theater
One Act Play 
2005(1A)

References

External links
Rice ISD website

Public high schools in Texas
Schools in Navarro County, Texas